

The Nieuport-Delage NiD 42 was a fighter aircraft built in France in the early 1920s, the first in a family of designs that would form the backbone of the French fighter force over the next decade.

Design and development
As first built, the NiD 42 was a highly streamlined parasol-wing monoplane with a monocoque fuselage  and an open cockpit of which a single prototype was built. Soon afterwards, Nieuport-Delage built two examples of a modified version for the 1924 Coupe Beaumont as the NiD 42S, on which the main wings were mounted directly to the sides of the upper fuselage at shoulder position with a short subsidiary wing fitted around the undercarriage axle. To further streamline the design, the surface radiators were installed on the upper surface of the wing.

Operational history
One of these aircraft was flown by Joseph Sadi-Lecointe in the race of 22 June and was the only one out of the five entrants to actually finish the course. Indeed, having finished the prescribed six laps of the  course, Sadi-Lecointe flew another four laps to break the world speed record over a 500-km closed-course.

While the NiD 42S was achieving these distinctions, development continued on the fighter version. Nieuport-Delage designed two further such variants in 1924; a single-seater designated NiD 42 C.1 and a similar machine with a second cockpit for a tail gunner with a machine gun in a ring mount, designated the NiD 42 C.2. One of the latter was exhibited at that year's Salon de l'Aéronautique, along with a NiD 42 C.1 nose section to illustrate an alternative engine mount. These differed from the original NiD 42 fighter in having a second, small wing added to the lower fuselage, turning the parasol monoplane into a sesquiplane, a design feature adopted from the NiD 37 which would be a key identifying feature through most of the versions developed from the 42.

Only two examples of the two-seater were built, but Nieuport-Delage entered the single-seater in the 1925 concours des monoplaces, a competition by the Army's Technical Service to find a replacement for the NiD 29. The NiD 42 was selected from a field of eleven competitors, and an order for 50 aircraft was placed, of which 25 were eventually delivered. Although impressive at the time it was designed, technology had already surpassed the NiD 42 when it entered service in 1928, particularly with regard to its wooden structure, and most of the development work associated with the design was made in an effort to cure it of a tendency to enter a flat spin. Nevertheless, it provided the foundation for further development as the NiD 52 and NiD 62.

Variants
 NiD 42 prototype single-seat parasol-wing monoplane fighter with  Hispano-Suiza 12Hb (one built)
 NiD 42S shoulder-wing monoplane racer with  Hispano-Suiza 12Hb (two built)
 NiD 42 C.1single-seat sesquiplane fighter with  Hispano-Suiza 12Hb (27 built, mostly for French AF, includes two for the Turkish Air Force
 NiD 42 C.2 two-seat sesquiplane fighter with  Hispano-Suiza 12Hb (two built)
 NiD 44 C.1 prototype sesquiplane fighter, powered by a  Lorraine 12Ew W-12 engine, to test alternate engine (one built)
 NiD 46 C.1prototype sesquiplane fighter with  Hispano-Suiza 12Gb to test alternate engine (one built)
 NiD 52 C.1 version for Spanish Air Force with  Hispano-Suiza 12Hb (126 built, including 125 under licence in Spain)
 NiD 62 C.1 production fighter version for French military with  Hispano-Suiza 12Hb (322 built)
 NiD 621
 advanced trainer powered by a  Hispano-Suiza 12Hb (three built)
 NiD 622
 production fighter powered by a  Hispano-Suiza 12Hb (314 built)
 NiD 623
 speed record aircraft modified from 62 powered by a  Lorraine 12Fd Courlis W-12 engine, (one built)
 NiD 624
 experimental altitude aircraft powered by a  Lorraine 12Fd Courlis W-12 engine, (one built)
 NiD 626
 variant for Peru with  Lorraine 12Hdr V-12 engine (12 built)
 NiD 628
 testbed for testing Farman turbocharger powered by a  Hispano-Suiza 12Mc (two built)
 NiD 629
 production fighter powered by a  Hispano-Suiza 12Mdsh (50 built for French)
 NiD 72 C.1
 metalized version for Belgium and Brazil powered by a  Hispano-Suiza 12Lb (16 built for Brazil and Belgium)
 NiD 82 C.1
 metalized prototype with  Hispano-Suiza 12Lb and entirely new wing and tail (one built)

Operators

 Belgian Air Force

 Brazilian Air Force
 
 Aéronautique Militaire
 2e Régiment d'Aviation
 3e Régiment d'Aviation
 38e Régiment d'Aviation
French Aéronavale

Peruvian Air Force

 Spanish Republican Air Force
 Aviación Nacional

Turkish Air Force

Specifications (NiD 42 C1)

References

Notes

Bibliography

 Hartmann, Gérard. "Les avions Nieuport-Delage." La Coupe Schneider et hydravions anciens/Dossiers historiques hydravions et moteurs, 2006.
 The Illustrated Encyclopedia of Aircraft (Part Work 1982-1985). London: Orbis Publishing, 1985.
 Parmentier, Bruno. "Nieuport-Delage NiD-42." Aviafrance - Un siècle d'aviation française, 27 August 2000.
 Taylor, John W. R. and Jean Alexander. Combat Aircraft of the World. New York: G.P. Putnam's Sons, 1969. .
 Taylor, Michael J. H. Jane's Encyclopedia of Aviation. London: Studio Editions, 1989. .

External links
 "The Nieuport-Delage Type 42." Flight, 24 July 1924, pp. 461–462.
 "The Paris Aero Show 1924."  Flight,''  11 December 1924, pp. 766–777.

1920s French fighter aircraft
 042
Sesquiplanes